Annesley Hall is the all-female residence at Victoria College, University of Toronto. The residence is located across from the Royal Ontario Museum and is designated a National Historic Site of Canada.

Built in 1903 in the Queen Anne style, Annesley Hall is the first university residence built for women in Canada. It was designed by architect George Martel Miller. Annesley Hall was home to the first female resident at the University, as well as the first woman to graduate from a Canadian medical school.

Annesley is noted for its close-knit community life and is also known for its elegance and uniqueness. No two rooms are the same, and students in Annesley are able to enjoy exclusive common space, such as the Tackaberry Library and the Music Room, found on the main floor.

Annesley Hall was a location used in the shoot of the 1974 horror movie Black Christmas. It was renovated and restored in 1988–1989.

References

Further reading
 O'Grady, Jean (2001). Margaret Addison: A Biography. McGill-Queens University Press.  — Biography of the founding dean of Annesley Hall who served from 1903 until 1931.

External links
 

University of Toronto buildings
University residences in Canada
National Historic Sites in Ontario
Queen Anne architecture in Canada